Ta Oo Ka Saytanar Ta Oo Ka Myittar is a 1976 Burmese black-and-white drama film, directed by Thukha starring Kawleikgyin Ne Win, Kyaw Hein and Tin Tin Nyo.

Cast
Kawleikgyin Ne Win as Saya Chit
Kyaw Hein as Bo
Tin Tin Nyo as Khin Moe
May Thit as Daw May Thit
Kyauk Lone as U Aung

References

1976 films
1970s Burmese-language films
Films shot in Myanmar
Burmese black-and-white films
1976 drama films
Burmese drama films